Harare, originally known as Salisbury, is the capital and most populous city of Zimbabwe. The city proper has an area of 940 km2 (371 mi2) and a population of 2.12 million in the 2012 census and an estimated 3.12 million in its metropolitan area in 2019. Situated in north-eastern Zimbabwe in the country's Mashonaland region, Harare is a metropolitan province, which also incorporates the municipalities of Chitungwiza and Epworth.

The city was founded in 1890 by the Pioneer Column, a small military force of the British South Africa Company, and named Fort Salisbury after the UK Prime Minister Lord Salisbury. Company administrators demarcated the city and ran it until Southern Rhodesia achieved responsible government in 1923. Salisbury was thereafter the seat of the Southern Rhodesian (later Rhodesian) government and, between 1953 and 1963, the capital of the Central African Federation. It retained the name Salisbury until 1982, when it was renamed Harare on the second anniversary of Zimbabwean independence from the United Kingdom.

Long the commercial capital of Zimbabwe, Harare has seen economic ups and downs since the 2000s. It remains an important centre of commerce, government, finance, real estate, manufacturing, healthcare, design, education, art, culture, tourism, agriculture, mining and regional affairs. Harare has the second-highest number of embassies in Southern Africa and serves as the location of the African headquarters of the World Health Organization, which it shares with Brazzaville.

Harare has hosted multiple international conferences and events, including the 1995 All-Africa Games and the 2003 Cricket World Cup. In 2018, Harare was ranked as a Gamma world city. The city's marquee festival is the Harare International Festival of the Arts, modelled on the Edinburgh Festival and one of the largest arts festivals in the southern hemisphere. It is also home to Dynamos FC, the club with the most titles in Zimbabwean football.

History 

The Pioneer Column, a military volunteer force of settlers organised by Cecil Rhodes, founded the city on 12 September 1890 as a fort. They originally named the city Fort Salisbury after The 3rd Marquess of Salisbury, then-Prime Minister of the United Kingdom, and it subsequently became known simply as Salisbury. The Salisbury Polo Club was formed in 1896. It was declared to be a municipality in 1897 and it became a city in 1935.

The area at the time of founding of the city was poorly drained and earliest development was on sloping ground along the left bank of a stream that is now the course of a trunk road (Julius Nyerere Way). The first area to be fully drained was near the head of the stream and was named Causeway as a result. This area is now the site of many of the most important government buildings, including the Senate House and the Office of the Prime Minister, now renamed for the use of the President after the position was abolished in January 1988.

Salisbury was the capital of the self-governing British colony of Southern Rhodesia from 1923, and of the Federation of Rhodesia and Nyasaland from 1953 to 1963. Ian Smith's Rhodesian Front government declared Rhodesia independent from the United Kingdom on 11 November 1965, and proclaimed the Republic of Rhodesia in 1970.  Subsequently, the nation became the short-lived state of Zimbabwe Rhodesia, it was not until 18 April 1980 that the country was internationally recognised as independent as the Republic of Zimbabwe.

Post-war period
In the immediate years after World War II, Salisbury expanded rapidly, its growth boosted by its designation as the capital of the Federation of Rhodesia and Nyasaland, which ushered in a wave of liberalism, investment and developmentalism from 1953 to 1963, transforming the city's skyline in the process. This was accompanied by significant post-war immigration, primarily from Great Britain, across Southern Africa and to a lesser extent, Southern Europe. The rapid rise of motor vehicle ownership and the investment in road development greatly accelerated the outward suburban sprawl and saw the development of suburbs such as Alexandra Park and Mount Pleasant. At the same time mostly black suburbs such as Highfield suffered from overcrowding as the population boomed.

The optimism and prosperity of this period proved to be short-lived, as the Federation collapsed, which hindered the city's prosperity.

Post-independence years 

The city initially boomed under a wave of optimism and investment that followed the country's independence in 1980. The name of the city was changed to Harare on 18 April 1982, the second anniversary of Zimbabwean independence, taking its name from the village near Harare Kopje of the Shona chief Neharawa, whose nickname was "he who does not sleep". Prior to independence, "Harare" was the name of the black residential area now known as Mbare.

Significant investment in education and healthcare produced a confident and growing middle class, evidenced by the rise of firms such as Econet Global and innovative design and architecture, exemplified by the Eastgate Centre. A notable symbol of this era in Harare's history is the New Reserve Bank Tower, one of the city's major landmarks.

However, by 1992, Harare began to experience an economic downturn and the government responded by enacting neoliberal reforms, which led to a boom in banking, finance and agriculture, while leading to significant job losses in manufacturing, thereby greatly increasing unemployment and income inequality. Domestic firms struggled to compete with foreign imports leading to the collapse of several institutions, particularly in the textile industry.

Economic difficulties and hyperinflation (1999–2008) 
In the early twenty-first century, Harare has been adversely affected by the political and economic crisis that is plaguing Zimbabwe, after the contested 2002 presidential election and 2005 parliamentary elections. The elected council was replaced by a government-appointed commission for alleged inefficiency, but essential services such as rubbish collection and street repairs rapidly worsened, and are now virtually non-existent in poorer parts of the city. In May 2006, the Zimbabwean newspaper the Financial Gazette, described the city in an editorial as a "sunshine city-turned-sewage farm". In 2009, Harare was voted to be the toughest city to live in according to the Economist Intelligence Unit's livability poll. The situation was unchanged in 2011, according to the same poll, which is based on stability, healthcare, culture and environment, education, and infrastructure.

Operation Murambatsvina 
In May 2005, the Zimbabwean government demolished shanties, illegal vending sites, backyard cottages in Harare, Epworth and the other cities in the country in Operation Murambatsvina ("Drive Out Trash"). It was widely alleged that the true purpose of the campaign was to punish the urban poor for supporting the opposition Movement for Democratic Change and to reduce the likelihood of mass action against the government by driving people out of the cities. The government claimed it was necessitated by a rise of criminality and disease. This was followed by Operation Garikayi/Hlalani Kuhle (Operation "Better Living") a year later, which consisted of building concrete housing of poor quality.

Economic uncertainty 
In late March 2010, Harare's Joina City Tower was finally opened after fourteen years of delayed construction, marketed as Harare's new Pride. Initially, uptake of space in the tower was low, with office occupancy at only 3% in October 2011. By May 2013, office occupancy had risen to around half, with all the retail space occupied.

The Economist Intelligence Unit rated Harare as the world's least liveable city out of 140 surveyed in February 2011, rising to 137th out of 140 in August 2012.

In March 2015, Harare City Council planned a two-year project to install 4,000 solar street lights, at a cost of $15,000,000 starting in the central business district.

In November 2017, the biggest demonstration in the history of the Republic of Zimbabwe was held in Harare, which led to the forced resignation of the long-serving 93-year-old President of Zimbabwe, Robert Mugabe, an event which was part of the first successful coup in Zimbabwe.

Contemporary Harare
Since 2000, Harare has experienced periods of spectacular decline, particularly in the 2000s, but since the Great Recession it has stabilised and experienced significant population growth, along with uneven economic growth. Despite this volatility (or perhaps because of it), there has been substantial international investment and speculation in the city's financial and property markets. Major development has occurred on the urban fringes of the city has occurred in areas such as Borrowdale, Glen Lorne, The Grange, Mount Pleasant Heights, and the new suburbs of, Hogerty Hill, Shawasha Hills, Bloomingdale and Westlea resulting in urban sprawl into nearby Mount Hampden, Ruwa and Norton. In addition, inner city areas such as Avondale, Eastlea, Belgravia, Newlands and Milton Park have seen increased gentrification driven by speculation from expat Zimbabweans that has also attracted other foreign buyers, resulting in high property prices and widespread rent increases. Harare sustained the highest population increase and urban development of any major Zimbabwean city since 2000, with other cities such as Bulawayo, Gweru and Mutare largely stagnating during the same period.

From 2006, the growth of the city extended into its northern and western fringes, beyond the city's urban growth boundary. Predictions of the metropolitan area reaching 4 to 5 million by 2025, have sparked concerns of unchecked sprawl and unregulated development. In addition, the concentration of real estate development in Harare has come at the expense of other cities such as Gweru, and Bulawayo, particularly the latter, which is increasingly characterized by stagnation and high unemployment due to the collapse of many of its heavy industries. Today, Harare's property market remains highly priced, more so than regional cities such as Johannesburg and Cape Town, with the top end of the market completely dominated by wealthier dual-citizen Zimbabweans (see Zimbabwean diaspora and Zimbabweans in the United Kingdom), Chinese and South African buyers and largely unaffordable to most locals. Such gentrification and speculation is especially jarring given the country's high unemployment. Additionally, in 2020, Harare was classified as a Gamma city by the Globalization and World Cities Research Network.

Demographics 
The population of Harare is 2,123,132 people. Over 90% of people in Harare are Shona-speaking people of African descent. Harare is also home to many Ndebele people and Kalanga people as well. Roughly 25,000 White Zimbabweans live in the Harare metro area as well.

Geography

Topography
The original landscape could be described as a "parkland". The soils of Harare are reddish brown granular clay in northern and central areas, while some of the southern part has greyish brown sand over pale loamy sand or sandy loam.

Suburbs 

The Northern and North Eastern suburbs of Harare are home to the more affluent population of the city including former president Robert Mugabe who lived in Borrowdale Brooke. These northern suburbs are often referred to as 'dales' because of the common suffix -dale found in some suburbs such as Avondale, Greendale and Borrowdale. The dwellings are mostly low density homes of 3 bedrooms or more and these usually are occupied by families.

Harare is often referred to as Zimbabwe's garden or sunshine city for its abundant parks and outdoor amenities. Harare's parks are often considered the best public parks in all of Zimbabwe's major cities. There are also many parks in the surrounding suburbs, particularly the affluent Northern suburbs of Borrowdale, Mount Pleasant and Glen Lorne, north east of the central business district. Several national parks have been designated around the urban area, including the Ewanrigg Botanical Gardens, Domboshava National Park, and Lake Chivero among others. The extensive area covered by Harare is formally divided into hundreds of suburbs, along with independent municipalities such as Epworth, Mount Hampden, Norton, Ruwa and Chitungwiza within the greater metropolitan area.

The Central Business District, Causeway, Rotten Row & The Avenues
The central business district, is characterized by wide streets and a mix of historic, post-war and modern buildings. There are some colonial-era buildings like the Parliament buildings and Civic Centre, but the rest are unremarkable post war buildings. The district is also notable for a number of upmarket hotels such as the Meikles Hotel which are relatively luxurious but not particularly modern. Other downtown sights include, the Kopje Africa Unity Square, the Harare Gardens, the National Gallery, the August House parliamentary buildings and the National Archives. Causeway, a road and sub-neighbourhood of central Harare, is a busy workaday area that acts as the city's embassy row, (along with Belgravia to the north east), in which numerous embassies, diplomatic missions, research institutes, and other international organizations are concentrated. Additionally, many government ministries and museums such as the Zimbabwe Museum of Human Sciences, are located here.

Rotten Row is a sub-district of downtown Harare that begins at the intersection of Prince Edward Street and Samora Machel Avenue and runs to the flyover where it borders Mbare on Cripps Road. Rotten Row was named after a road in London of the same name. The name "Rotten Row" is a corrupted form of the French phrase ‘Route du Roi’, the King's Road. It is best known as Harare's legal district home to The Harare Magistrate's Court, the city's central library and the ZANU-PF building, along with numerous law offices. The neighbourhood also lends its name of to the eponymous book by Petina Gappah published in 2016.
 	
The adjacent Avenues area is most notable as the city's red light district but its image has improved as more young and relatively well-off residents have moved to the area partially gentrifying the inner suburb. However, the area remains somewhat unsafe at night.

The Inner-East
Eastlea, Highlands, Greendale, Milton Park
 
These are generally densely populated, well-kept compact suburbs. Historically home to newly arrived immigrants and lower middle class residents the area now attracts young professionals, recent graduates and flat dwellers. Traditionally middle to lower-middle class, these neighbourhoods has become relatively more expensive and gentrified, beginning in the 1990s. The Inner East ranks among the most walkable suburbs in the City of Harare with attractive townhouses, and flats, along with mixed-use areas, making them extremely desirable not just to locals but outside investors who have fueled the city's real estate boom over the past decade.  These suburbs are often considered a ‘middle-zone’ between affluent northern areas like Avondale West and Glen Lorne, and the grittier city centre. Houses in Eastlea and Greendale are increasingly being bought by small businesses due to lack of space in the downtown, and as one may find an IT company that has a swimming pool and garden. Highlands is also notable for its temperate micro-climate and being home of the Zimbabwe Broadcasting Corporation, while Milton Park, Harare is an emerging, bohemian, mixed-use area with residential, commercial and entertainment venues.

The Northeast
Chisipite, Colne Valley, Borrowdale, Borrowdale Brooke, Glen Lorne, Gunhill, The Grange, Pomona, Umwimsidale, Hogarty Hill
 		 
The most affluent and developed part of the city, especially Borrowdale and Glen Lorne. Sprawling lawns, tennis courts and large mansions dot many a suburb. It is also the greenest part of Harare: with hills overlooking green Msasa trees and well-kept gardens.Chisipite , colne valley,borrowdale inside borrowdale where there is borrowdale race course,Borrowdale brook,glen lorne,gunhill, the grange ,pomona and hogarty hill are upper middle class,Umwinsidale is for the rich elite very important people live there. In recent years a number of building projects were started and stalled due to lack of money and the unpredictability of the Zimbabwean economy, which has left a number half-finished homes. Borrowdale in particular, is home to much of the country's elite, along with diplomats, business executives, expats and the second homes of wealthier members of the Zimbabwean diaspora. Much of city's Anglo African population tends to congregate here, along with the rest of the Northern suburbs. Shopping centres like Borrowdale Village and Sam Levy's Village, cater to the most affluent of the city's residents.  Crime is low by international standards and at night, the area is home to various pubs, bars, restaurants and nightclubs.

The North
Avondale West, Strathaven, Mount Pleasant, Alexandra Park, Belgravia, Bluff Hill, Greystone Park
 	
Well-to-do suburbs and also all uppermiddle class with pretty tree-lined avenues and coffee shops tucked near gardens. These are among the more well-off areas of Harare, but not as wealthy as the North-East. Avondale Shopping Centre is the areas commercial heart, noted for its theatres, flea market and independent stores. Mount Pleasant is home to the University of Zimbabwe the country's leading tertiary and research institution, which gives the area an academic and bohemian atmosphere when school is in session. Unfortunately, a lack of funding from the government means that the area is unaffordable to students, hindering the development of a true student ghetto as most students have to commute to Mount Pleasant due to a lack of student housing. Another new building in Harare is the British Embassy built in 2008 and nearby Arundel office park houses the regional United Nations offices.

The Northwest
Avondale, Emerald Hill, Avonlea, Greencroft, Mabelreign, Malborough, Saint Andrews Park, Westgate

The city's North West is largely a leafy and residential upper middle class and comfortable middle class area also known as the middle- middle class  best known for the outdoor mall at Westgate, home to numerous independent stores, movie theatres and other higher-end shopping. The area is also host to the new US embassy. Also, Saint Andrews Park is best known for the Warren Hills Golf Course as well as its proximity to the National Sports Stadium.

Nearby Emerald Hill is named so either due to the green colour of the hill due to the large number of trees or its Irish connections – many of the roads in the suburb have Irish names, such as Dublin, Belfast, Wicklow and Cork. The area is also notable for its Catholic institutions such as St. John's High School and the Dominican Convent. While the area was home to an Irish Catholic community they have largely been assimilated into the larger white Zimbabwean community or have joined the ranks of the Zimbabwean diaspora abroad. Other parts of the North West are leafy and quiet but have become slightly rough around the edges since the mid-2000s. The country's economic crisis in that decade led to thousands of local university-educated residents and professionals emigrating to the United Kingdom, Canada and Australia, thus the area lacks much of the wealth and vibrancy it had in the nineties.

The East
Arcadia, Braeside, Hillside, Belvedere, Hatfield, St. Martins, Newlands, Arlington
 
Notable suburbs include Arcadia, Hillside and Braeside, renowned for their historic Goffal (Coloured Zimbabwean) communities and Belvedere and Hatfield, noted for their Asian residents of Indian descent.
 
Newlands was named by Colin Duff, the secretary for Agriculture in the 1920s, who had played for Western Cape Province before heading north. When Gerhardt Van der Byl retired back to the Cape Town in 1927, he sold his farm Welmoed to the Salisbury Real Estate Co, a property vehicle owned largely by Scots. Arlington is a newer residential settlement east of the capital adjacent to Harare International Airport. Owned by former mayor of Salisbury, Mayor Brown named his farm, Arlington. He was from Iowa and joined occupational forces to collect specimens for the Smithsonian Institution in Washington, D.C.

The Industrial South-Central
Workington, Southerton, Willowvale, Graniteside, Tynwald
 	
Harare's big factories are here, producing clothing, soft drinks, bricks and vehicles. Once home to Southern European immigrants of Greek, Italian and Portuguese extraction, most residents today are working and lower middle class coloured people and the descendants of Zambian, Mozambique and Malawian immigrants. Willowvale, is perhaps best known for the 1988 Willowgate scandal implicated several members of the ZANU-PF party in a scheme where automobiles were illegally resold by various government officials.

The High Density Southwest

Dzivarasekwa, Warren Park, Kuwadzana, Mufakose, Budiriro, Highfield, Glen View, Waterfalls
 	
These areas are a mixture of medium- and high-density areas also very few low- density areas example in glenview and waterfalls, not much tourism occurs in these areas. Houses are generally smaller and more tightly packed together. Some of these townships were initially set up by the city government from the 1930s onwards. Highfield is second-oldest high-density suburb in Harare was established in 1930. It was established for black settlement during the United Federal Party government of Godfrey Huggins. Highfield was primarily set up by the colonial Government to provide labour to the Southerton and Workington industrial areas.
 	
Residents are mainly poor and working-class, although there are more lower middle class members who have bigger properties: the townships are varied and each has its own personality, and were home to famous musicians such as Oliver Mtukudzi and Thomas Mapfumo. They are also home to a number of small industries, however, the region also has the highest unemployment and poverty rate in the city. The poor state of the area has been exacerbated by neglect from city government, leading to a lack of adequate electric, water and sanitary services in the area. These poor conditions have led to many former residents to choose to move south to Johannesburg and other cities in South Africa, but they are quickly replaced by the internal migration of rural Zimbabweans seeking opportunity in the city.

Climate

Under the Köppen climate classification, Harare has a subtropical highland climate (Köppen Cwb), an oceanic climate variety. Because the city is situated on a plateau, its high altitude and cool south-easterly airflow cause it to have a climate that is cooler and drier than a tropical or subtropical climate.

This is due to its high altitude position and the prevalence of a cool south-easterly airflow.

There are three main seasons: a warm, wet summer from November to March/April; a cool, dry winter from May to August (corresponding to winter in the Southern Hemisphere); and a warm to hot, dry season in September/October.

Very little rain typically falls during the period May to September, although sporadic showers occur most years. Rainfall varies a great deal from year to year and follows cycles of wet and dry periods from 7 to 10 years long. Records begin in October 1890 but all three Harare stations stopped reporting in early 2004.

The climate supports a natural vegetation of open woodland. The most common tree of the local region is the Msasa Brachystegia spiciformis that colours the landscape wine red with its new leaves in late August. Two introduced species of trees, the jacaranda and the flamboyant from South America and Madagascar respectively, which were introduced during the colonial era, contribute to the city's colour palette with streets lined with either the lilac blossoms of the jacaranda or the flame red blooms from the flamboyant. They flower in October/November and are planted on alternative streets in the capital. Also prevalent is bougainvillea. Some trees from Northern Hemisphere middle latitudes are also cultivated, including American sweetgum, English oak, Japanese oak and Spanish oak.

International venue 
Harare has been the location of several international summits such as the 8th Summit of the Non-Aligned Movement (6 September 1986) and Commonwealth Heads of Government Meeting 1991. The latter produced the Harare Declaration, dictating the membership criteria of the Commonwealth. In 1998, Harare was the host city of the 8th Assembly of the World Council of Churches.

In 1995, Harare hosted most of the sixth All-Africa Games, sharing the event with other Zimbabwean cities such as Bulawayo and Chitungwiza. It has hosted some of the matches of 2003 Cricket World Cup which was hosted jointly by Kenya, South Africa and Zimbabwe. Several of the matches were also held in Bulawayo. Harare also hosted the ICC Cricket 2018 World Cup Qualifier matches in March 2018.

The city is also the site of one of the Harare International Festival of the Arts (HIFA), which has featured such acclaimed artists as Cape Verdean singer Sara Tavares.

Economy 
Harare is Zimbabwe's leading financial, commercial, and communications centre, as well as an international trade centre for tobacco, maize, cotton, and citrus fruits. Manufacturing, including textiles, steel, and chemicals, are also economically significant, as is the trade of precious minerals such as gold, diamonds and platinum. It has also experienced a real estate boom recently, particularly in the wealthy Northern suburbs, with prices rising dramatically over the last decade, despite challenges in other sectors of the economy. This boom has largely been fueled by members of the Zimbabwean diaspora and speculation, with investors hedging against the local currency. However the once booming market has begun to cool off due to a 2019 hike in interest rates and the economic fallout from the COVID-19 pandemic, leaving a number of projects unfinished.
Harare has been the location of several international summits such as the 8th Summit of the Non-Aligned Movement (6 September, 1986) and Commonwealth Heads of Government Meeting 1991. The latter produced the Harare Declaration, dictating the membership criteria of the Commonwealth. In 1998, Harare was the host city of the 8th Assembly of the World Council of Churches.
While it may have seemed the economy was finally making a recovery, early investor optimism following the inauguration of the Mnangagwa government has largely subsided due to the slow pace of reforms to improve the business environment.  The economy suffered high inflation and frequent power outages in 2019, which further hampered investment. A lack of implementation of adequate monetary reforms to complement the government's efforts to reduce the budget deficit also undermined investor confidence in the financial sector. Although the government has repeatedly stressed its focus on improving transparency, the ease of doing business, and fighting corruption, progress remains limited under the Mnangagwa administration.

Another challenge to Harare's economy is the persistent emigration of highly educated and skilled residents to the United Kingdom, Australia, Canada, the Ireland and New Zealand, largely due to the economic downturn and political unrest. The city's brain drain, almost unprecedented compared to other emerging markets, has led to the decline of a local entrepreneurial class, an overstretched and declining middle class and a dearth of employment opportunities outside the informal and public sector. In addition, the city's working class residents are increasingly moving to nearby South Africa and Botswana, though they are readily replaced by less well off rural migrants. However, despite over a decade of neglect, the city's infrastructure and human capital still compares favorably with cities in other parts of Africa, and Latin America. It remains to be seen whether the current government can entice its young, diverse and well educated Zimbabwean diaspora numbering some 4 to 7 million people, to invest in the economy, let alone consider returning.

Shopping and retail
Locally produced art, handicrafts and souvenirs can be purchased at Doon Estate, Uwminsdale, Avondale Market and Mbare Musika. Msasa Park and Umwinsdale in particular, host a number of galleries that produce, high-quality Shona soapstone sculptures and textiles such as Patrick Mavros studios, which has another gallery in Knightsbridge, London. International brands are generally less common in Harare than in European cities, however conventional and luxury shopping can be found on Fife Avenue, Sam Nujoma (Union) Avenue, Arundel Village, Avondale, Borrowdale, Eastgate and Westgate. Virtually all luxury shopping is concentrated in the wealthier Northern suburbs, particularly Borrowdale with stores that command higher prices than most visitors would expect. The Borrowdale and Borrowdale Brooke neighborhoods are regarded among the most sophisticated places in town, with upscale shopping, restaurants and amenities.

Harare also has a good choice of supermarkets including Le Bon Marche, Pick n Pay, TM and Spar. Greater variety and independent stores tend to be concentrated in the North, Northeast and Northwest suburbs along with, surprisingly, Newlands and Greendale Avenue in Greendale.

Transportation 

Harare is a relatively young city, which sprawled during the country's post-Federation and post-independence booms and was segregated along racial and class lines until 1980, resulting in a mostly low density urban area geared towards private motorists, lacking a convenient public transportation system. Very little investment has been made to develop an effective and integrated public transportation system, leaving a significant number of the city's residents dependent on the city's informal minibus taxis. The rise of local ridesharing apps such as GTaxi and Hwindi, has partly eased pressure on the city's transportation system, however they are still prices out of the range of most working people. In addition, bus services are also available but they are mostly geared towards intercity travel and recreation than journeys within Harare itself.

Public transport system within the city includes both public and private sector operations. The former consist of ZUPCO buses and National Railways of Zimbabwe commuter trains. Privately owned public transport comprised licensed station wagons, nicknamed emergency taxis until 1993, when the government began to replace them with licensed buses and minibuses, referred to officially as commuter omnibuses. Harare has two kinds of taxis, metered taxis and the much more ubiquitous share taxis or 'kombis'. Unlike many other cities, metered taxis generally do not drive around the city looking for passengers and instead must be called and ordered to a destination. The minibus "taxis" are the de facto day-to-day and essential form of transport for the majority of the population.

The National Railways of Zimbabwe operates a daily overnight passenger train service that runs from Harare to Mutare and another one from Harare to Bulawayo, using the Beira–Bulawayo railway. Harare is linked by long-distance bus services to most parts of Zimbabwe.

The city is crossed by Transafrican Highway 9 (TAH 9), which connects it to the cities of Lusaka and Beira.

The largest airport of the country, the Robert Gabriel Mugabe International Airport, serves Harare.

Education 
The University of Zimbabwe is located in Harare. Founded in 1952, the university is the country's oldest and largest, offering a wide range of undergraduate and postgraduate programs. The student population stands at 20,399, with 17,718 undergraduate students and 2,681 postgraduate students.

Sports 

Harare has long been regarded as Zimbabwe's sporting capital due to the role it has played in the development of Zimbabwean sport, the range and quality of its sporting events and venues, and its high rates of spectatorship and participation. The city is also home to more professional sports teams competing at the national and international level, than any other Zimbabwean city. Football is most popular sport in Harare, with the city producing many footballers who have gone on to play in the English Premier League and elsewhere.

Harare is also home to Harare Sports Club ground, which hosts many Test, One Day Internationals and T20I Cricket matches. It was also the one of the host cities for the 2003 Cricket World Cup. Harare is home to the Zimbabwe Premier Soccer League clubs, Dynamos F.C.,Black Rhinos F.C. and CAPS United F.C.
The main stadiums are National Sports Stadium and Rufaro Stadium.

Popular teams

The following table shows the sports teams in the Harare area, sorted primarily by attendance in the most recent season for which data is available.

 

 
Football and cricket
 
Football is the most popular sport in Harare, particularly among working-class residents. Cricket and rugby are also popular sports with those from middle-class backgrounds. Harare is home to Harare Sports Club ground. It has hosted many Test, One Day Internationals and T20 Cricket matches. The city successfully hosted most of the sixth All-Africa Games and several matches in the 2003 ICC Cricket World Cup at Harare Sports Club. Harare is also home to the Zimbabwe Premier Soccer League clubs Dynamos F.C., Harare City, Black Rhinos F.C. and CAPS United F.C.
 
The main football stadiums are National Sports Stadium and Rufaro Stadium.
 
Virtually all first class and international cricket matches are hosted at Harare Sports Club, with most domestic tours occurring in spring and summer. This city is also home to the Mashonaland Eagles in the domestic Logan Cup tournament. The Eagles are coached by renowned former Zimbabwe national cricket team batsman Grant Flower. The team are one of the country's strongest sides and last won the Logan Cup in the 2015–16 Logan Cup season.

Rugby
 		
The city is also the heartland of rugby union in Zimbabwe, rivaling Windhoek in Namibia as the strongest rugby region in Africa beyond South Africa. The governing Rhodesia Rugby Football Union was founded here in 1895, becoming the Zimbabwe Rugby Union in 1980. The union and national sides are based in the northern suburb of Alexandra Park. Harare is home to four of the country's national Super Six Rugby League (SSRL) clubs – Harare Sports Club, Old Georgians, Old Hararians and Old Miltonians. Additionally, the Zimbabwe Rugby Academy, the national development side which plays in the second division of the Currie Cup is largely made up of players from the city. International rugby test matches tend to be hosted at Harare Sports Club, the Police Grounds and at Hartsfield in Bulawayo with a particularly strong rivalry with the Namibia national rugby union team. Traditionally the city hosted tours by the British and Irish Lions, Argentina and the All-Blacks on their respective tours of South Africa, however, this is no longer the case due to the end of traditional rugby tours and the Zimbabwe national rugby union team's decline in the international rugby rankings. Indeed, Wales were the last major country to tour Harare back in 1993.
 	
High school teams are generally of a high standard with Prince Edward School, St. George's College, St. John's College all ranking among the country's leading teams and sending their first XV sides to compete against well-known South African high schools during Craven Week. Unfortunately after high school, the city's best players tend to move on to South Africa or the United Kingdom, due to a lack of professionalism and greater educational and earning opportunities abroad, thus depleting the strength of the rugby union in Zimbabwe. Notable internationals hailing from Harare include Tendai Mtawarira, Don Armand and Brian Mujati amongst numerous others.

Media 
Harare is host to some of Zimbabwe's leading media outlets. Despite accusations of government censorship and intimidation, the city maintains a robust press, much of which is defiantly critical of the current government. In print media, the most famous paper internationally, is the Herald, the city's oldest newspaper, founded in 1893 and former paper of record prior to its purchase by the government. The paper is best noted for its heavy censorship during the Rhodesian Front government from 1962 to 1979, with many of its articles appearing as redacted- with black boxes marking the words removed by government censors- before its forced purchase. Today it is largely seen as little more than a government mouthpiece by residents and overwhelmingly supports the government line.

In contrast, private newspapers continue to adopt a more independent line and enjoy a more diverse and vibrant readership, unmatched by most other African cities. These include the Financial Gazette, the high brow, financial paper of record, nicknamed 'the Pink Press', for its tradition of printing on a pink broadsheet. Other newspapers are the Zimbabwe Independent, a centre-left newspaper and de facto paper of record, noted for its investigative journalism; the Standard, a centre—left Sunday paper; NewsDay, a left-wing tabloid; H-Metro, a mass-market tabloid; the Daily News, a left wing opposition paper and Kwayedza, the leading Shona language newspaper in Zimbabwe.

Online media outlets include ZimOnline, ZimDaily, the Zimbabwe Guardian and NewZimbabwe.com amongst others.

Television and radio 
The state-owned ZBC TV maintains a monopoly on free to air TV channels in the city, with private broadcasters, such as the defunct Joy TV, coming and going based on the whims of the government. As a response, the majority of the households that can afford to, subscribe to the satellite television distributor, DStv for entertainment, news and sport from Africa and abroad.

Harare is also well served by radio, with a number of the country's leading radio stations, maintaining a presence in the city. There are currently four state-controlled Zimbabwe Broadcasting Corp. channels (SFM, Radio Zimbabwe, Power FM and National FM); and private national commercial free-to-air stations, Star FM, Capital 100.4 FM and ZiFM. In addition, Channel Zim, an alternative satellite channel, and VOA Zimbabwe also broadcast via inexpensive free-to air decoders. Eight newly licensed local commercial stations have been commissioned, but were not yet on air as of 2020.
 
Commercial stations tend to show similar trends in programming, with high percentages of music, talk radio or phone-in programs and sports over infrequent news bulletins. Also despite the country's 16 official languages, virtually all broadcasts occur in English, Shona and Ndebele.

Notable institutions 

 44 Harvest House
 Eastgate Centre
 Econet Wireless
 Gwanzura
 Joina City
 Mbare Musika
 Parirenyatwa Hospital
 Reserve Bank of Zimbabwe
 Sam Nujoma Street
 Zimbabwe Stock Exchange

Culture 

The arts are thriving in Harare, despite an economic and political crisis, whose effects have offered opportunities for satire, experimentation and reinvention. While authors and musicians such as Doris Lessing, Petina Gappah and Thomas Mapfumo have been long criticized the corruption and shortcomings of the Smith and Mugabe governments, the emergence of protest and critical theatre since 2000 has invigorated the local arts scene. Actors, directors and artists have joined musicians and writers in criticizing political maleficence and audiences have rallied behind them, making the local theatre and art scene one of the most vibrant in the southern hemisphere.

Notable institutions in the city include:

 National Gallery of Zimbabwe – home to displays of Shona art and stone sculpture
 Heroes Acre – Heroes Acre is a burial ground and national monument whose purpose is to commemorate pro-independence fighters killed during the Rhodesian Bush War and also contemporary Zimbabweans whose service to their country justifies their burial at the site.
 Zimbabwe Museum of Human Sciences –  near Rotten Row, documents the archaeology of Southern Africa through the Stone Age into the Iron Age.
 Chapungu Sculpture Park – a sculpture park in  Msasa Park, which displays the work of Zimbabwean stone sculptors. It was founded in 1970 by Roy Guthrie, who was instrumental in promoting the work of its sculptors worldwide.
 National Archives – The second floor Gallery has a small but comprehensive display of some of the artefacts relating to Zimbabwe which are insightful for understanding its history. These include newspapers, photographs other artefacts which detail milestones in Zimbabwean history, while the display on the mezzanine floor concentrates on the first Chimurenga, or Ndebele-Shona revolts of 1896–97 which puts into perspective the historical struggle for independence.  
 National Botanical Gardens – in Alexandra Park,  is a good place to visit for a walk or to see Zimbabwe or Southern African plants and woodland habitats such as the msasa, miombo or less commonly the Cape fynbos.
 Royal Harare Golf Course – an 18-hole championship course which also hosts the Zimbabwe Open each year, part of the Sunshine Tour; the fairways are set in msasa woodland with occasional antelope feeding on the grass.
 Vaughn Animal Sanctuary- along Shamva and Enterprise Roads and home lions, vervet monkeys and hyenas.
 Epworth Balancing Rocks – just south out of the city limits, is home to large extraordinary rock formations and ancient rock art friezes
 Cleveland Dam Recreational Park – on the Mutare highway (A3) magnificent msasa woodland bordering the edges of the dam and pretty views onto the Dam. We spotted cormorants and herons, as well as a water monitor, or leguaan and vervet monkeys. Best avoided at weekends.
 Ewanrigg Botanical Gardens-
 Lion and Cheetah Park – although there are few cheetahs presently, if you have only a few days in Harare, or have never seen a live lion, then the Park is worth a visit as it is close to town on the Bulawayo Road (A5).
 Mukuvisi Woodlands – in Hillside, comprises 263 hectares of indigenous Msasa and Miombo woodland are very conveniently located for an initial introduction to Zimbabwe's game life. It hosts zebra, giraffe, eland, wildebeest, ostrich and impala, including some of their young born within woodlands, as well as a wide variety of birdlife and indigenous flora.
 The Eastgate Centre- a pioneering and innovatively-designed shopping mall equidistant from Unity Square and Borrowdale.
 Mbare Musika market – the city's largest and most colourful market has a heady mix of fresh produce, local art and assorted goods. It's the curios that attract tourists here; there is a big collection of neo-traditional sculpture, wooden crafts and basketry. It is located in a poorer section of the city and pickpockets are rife, so it is best visited with a tour group.
 The Book Cafe – a bohemian hub of literary, social and musical discussion where writers, poets, singers and other artists perform – without censorship.
 Reps Theatre in Belgravia, hosts a diverse range performances ranging from classical music to improvisational and experimental theater.

Places of worship 
Among the places of worship, they are predominantly Christian churches and temples: Assemblies of God, Baptist Convention of Zimbabwe (Baptist World Alliance), Reformed Church in Zimbabwe (World Communion of Reformed Churches), Church of the Province of Central Africa (Anglican Communion), Roman Catholic Archdiocese of Harare (Catholic Church).

International relations
Harare has co-operation agreements and partnerships with the following towns:

  Cincinnati, United States
  Guangzhou, China
  Kazan, Russia
  Lago, Italy
  Maputo, Mozambique
  Munich, Germany
  Nakhon Ratchasima, Thailand
  Nottingham, United Kingdom
  Prato, Italy
  Windhoek, Namibia

Gallery

See also 
 Districts of Zimbabwe
 Place names in Zimbabwe
 Provinces of Zimbabwe

References

Bibliography

External links
 

 
Populated places in Harare Province
Capitals in Africa
Populated places established in 1890
1890 establishments in Africa
1890 establishments in the British Empire